Alexander Edward Murray, 6th Earl of Dunmore (1 June 1804 – 15 July 1845) was the son of George Murray, 5th Earl of Dunmore.

On 27 September 1836 in Frankfurt, Germany, he married Lady Catherine Herbert, daughter of the 11th Earl of Pembroke. They had four children:

Lady Susan Catherine Mary Murray ( 7 Jul 1837 – 27 April 1915), married James Carnegie, 9th Earl of Southesk
Lady Constance Euphemia Woronzow Murray (28 Dec 1838 – 16 March 1922), married William Elphinstone, 15th Lord Elphinstone
Charles Adolphus Murray, 7th Earl of Dunmore (24 Mar 1841 – 27 Aug 1907)
Lady Victoria Alexandrina, or Lady Alexandrina Victoria Murray (19 Jul 1845 – 21 Nov 1911), married Rev. Henry Cunliffe (1826–1894), son of Sir Robert Henry Cunliffe, 4th Baronet.

References

External links

Earls of Dunmore
1804 births
1845 deaths
Alexander
Nairne, Alexander Murray, 6th Earl of